The Line, the Cross and the Curve is a 1993 British musical short film directed by and starring singer Kate Bush, co-starring Miranda Richardson and choreographer Lindsay Kemp, who had served as dance mentor to Bush early in her career.

This short film is essentially an extended music video featuring songs from Bush's 1993 album, The Red Shoes, which in turn was inspired by the classic movie musical-fantasy The Red Shoes.

In this version of the tale, Bush plays a frustrated singer-dancer who is enticed by a mysterious woman (Richardson) into putting on a pair of magical ballet slippers. Once on her feet, the shoes start dancing on their own, and Bush's character (who is never referred to by name) must battle Richardson's character to free herself from the spell of the shoes. Her guide on this strange journey is played by Kemp.

The film was released direct-to-video in most areas, and was only a modest success. Kate Bush later expressed her displeasure with the final product, calling it "a load of bollocks". Soon after its release, Bush effectively dropped out of the public eye until her eighth studio album, Aerial, was released in November 2005.

Two years after the UK release, due to late promotion in the US, the film was nominated for the Grammy Award for Best Long Form Music Video in 1996.

The film continues to be played in arthouse cinemas around the world, and was screened at Hollywood Theatre in 2014 along with modern dance interpretations to Bush's music.

Song listing (as listed on video cover)
"Rubberband Girl" 4:33
"And So Is Love" 5:32
"The Red Shoes" 4:02
"Lily" 4:05
"The Red Shoes" (instrumental) 6:58
"Moments of Pleasure" 4:32
"Eat the Music" 5:07
"The Red Shoes" 3:57

All songs apart from "Lily" were also used as promotional videos for the corresponding singles from Bush's The Red Shoes album. The version used for "Eat the Music" had several differences from the film version, excising all footage featuring Richardson and of Bush's ballet shoe-clad feet running across the fruit-covered floor, while adding additional dancing and singing sequences featuring Bush and new footage featuring two male dancers sparring with watermelons on their heads and of Bush having a line of black make-up applied to her cheeks.

The "Rubberband Girl" and "Moments of Pleasure" clips were included on The Whole Story '94 video CD which also featured videos from the albums The Whole Story and The Sensual World.

References

External links

Line, the Cross, and the Curve, The
1990s musical films
1993 films
British musical films
1990s English-language films
1990s British films